HMS Blean was a Type III  of the Royal Navy.  She was named after the Blean Beagles Hunt at the village of Blean just north of Canterbury. She had the shortest career of any of the Hunt-class destroyers.

Built at Hebburn-on-Tyne by Hawthorn Leslie, she was laid down on 22 February 1941, launched on 15 January 1942 and commissioned on 23 August 1942.

Service history
After working up at Scapa Flow followed by some repairs on the Thames she escorted a convoy to Gibraltar arriving on 2 November 1942. She then joined the 58th Destroyer Division escorting Operation Torch convoys. The U-boat aimed one torpedo against her and then one against the convoy, but both hit Blean and she sank within four minutes with the loss of 89 men.

A memorial to her was unveiled in the church of St. Cosmus and St. Damian in the village of Blean on 10 December 2006.

References

Publications

External links
HMS Cavalier site
Casualty list
U-boat.net

 

Hunt-class destroyers of the Royal Navy
Ships built on the River Tyne
1942 ships
World War II destroyers of the United Kingdom
Ships sunk by German submarines in World War II
World War II shipwrecks in the Mediterranean Sea
Maritime incidents in December 1942